Gary Rowett (born 6 March 1974) is an English professional football manager and former player, who is currently manager of Championship club Millwall.

As a player, he was a defender, and played in the Premier League for Everton, Derby County, Leicester City and Charlton Athletic. He also played in the Football League for Cambridge United, Blackpool, Birmingham City and Burton Albion. His professional career ended in 2004, through a knee injury.

In May 2009, he was appointed assistant manager to Paul Peschisolido at Burton, and took over as manager in 2012. He was appointed the manager of Birmingham City in October 2014 and served until December 2016. He became Derby County manager in March 2017, and joined Stoke City in May 2018. After failing to mount a promotion challenge, he was sacked in January 2019 and was appointed manager of Millwall that October.

Playing career
He started his career at Cambridge United as a product of their youth system. He was part of the Cambridge team which achieved fifth place in the 1991–92 Second Division, which remains the club's best league finish to date. They were also play-off semi-finalists that year. He was also part of their best ever League Cup run when they reached the quarter-finals the following season. After three seasons at the Abbey Stadium he earned a move to the Premiership with Everton in March 1994 for £200,000. Everton won the FA Cup in his first full season, but Rowett was not involved in the 1995 FA Cup run or the final against Manchester United. After failing to break into the first team, Rowett went on loan to Blackpool before being sold to Derby County in part-exchange for Craig Short. Rowett spent three seasons at Derby, followed by a two-year spell with Birmingham City, where he helped the club reach the play-offs. 

In June 2000, Rowett returned to the Premier League by joining Leicester City. Southampton  had been interested in him and bid £2 million, but could not better Leicester's £3 million due to the costs of their new stadium. He competed in the UEFA Cup, where they lost in the first round on penalties to Red Star Belgrade. His first top-flight goal for the club on 3 February 2001 won the game 2–1 against Chelsea at Filbert Street, within seconds of the opposition's goal by Jimmy Floyd Hasselbaink. 

In May 2002, he switched to Charlton Athletic for £3.5 million. Charlton manager Alan Curbishley had wanted to sign Rowett for years, but he chose Leicester as they were closer to his home and competing in the UEFA Cup. His only goal for them earned a 1–1 home draw against Sunderland on 3 November 2002. He retired from professional football in July 2004 due to a knee injury, weeks after his defensive partner Richard Rufus, having made only 13 league appearances in two years at The Valley. He did return to play for Burton Albion in the Conference National, having been persuaded by manager Nigel Clough in 2005.

Managerial career

Burton Albion

In May 2009, Rowett was named as assistant to newly appointed manager Paul Peschisolido at Burton Albion. Rowett was put in temporary charge of Burton, assisted by Kevin Poole, following Peschisolido's sacking in March 2012. On 10 May, Rowett was announced as the permanent manager of Burton Albion. In his first season, he led Burton to fourth place in League Two, losing in the play-off semi-final to Bradford City, and followed up with a sixth-place finish in 2013–14 and a 1–0 defeat to Fleetwood in the play-off final.

Whilst in charge of Burton, Rowett oversaw their best ever League Cup performance, as they reached the third round in 2012–13 before being eliminated by Bradford City. They equaled this achievement two years later under his successor Jimmy Floyd Hasselbaink. Unfortunately, he was also in charge for their two worst defeats in the Football League, both 7–1. The first was against Bristol Rovers in April 2012, while he was still temporary manager, and the second against Port Vale in April 2013.

In September 2014, with Burton near the top of League Two, Rowett rejected the opportunity to manage Championship strugglers Blackpool; he said he felt it was not the right job for him at the present time.

Birmingham City
On 27 October 2014, Rowett was appointed the manager of his former club, Birmingham City – one place above Blackpool at the bottom of the Championship table. He was joined at Birmingham by Burton backroom staff members Kevin Summerfield as assistant manager, Mark Sale as first-team coach and Poole as goalkeeping coach. All three are also former Birmingham City players. Rowett guided Birmingham from 21st in the Championship to 10th at the end of his first season, earning many plaudits for the remarkable turnaround in form.

Rowett was sacked by Birmingham on 14 December 2016 upon their change of ownership and boardroom team, despite leading the team to 7th in the Championship table and challenging for a play-off place. The decision was met with surprise and criticism by Birmingham supporters, with the club appointing Gianfranco Zola as his replacement. Zola resigned as Birmingham manager in April 2017, after a sequence of only two wins in 24 games throughout his tenure as manager left the club embroiled in a relegation battle.

Derby County
Rowett was appointed as the new manager of Championship club Derby County, another of his former clubs as a player, on 14 March 2017, and signed a contract until the end of the 2018–19 season. Rowett took over with Derby sat in tenth place, taking fifteen points from their final nine games to guide them to a ninth-placed finish.

Rowett signed five players ahead of the 2017–18 season largely focusing on adding experience to a Derby side which had gained a reputation for post-Christmas slumps in form Players such as Tom Huddlestone (30) and Curtis Davies (32) raised the squad's average age to 28.2 years old, the second-highest in the division. After a slow start of just 3 wins from the opening 10 games left them 15th in the table, 13 wins from the following 20 matches saw the team climb to 2nd place at the turn of  the year, with Rowett winning Championship Manager of the Month for October and December 2017. On 9 January 2018, Rowett was linked with the managerial vacancy at Premier League club Stoke City, but instead signed an improved contract, lasting until 2021.

Despite Rowett adding further experience to the squad with the signing of 31-year old Cameron Jerome in the January transfer window, Derby again suffered a post-January slump, winning just 2 out of 13 league matches, a run that included heavy defeats to relegation candidates Sunderland and Burton Albion to briefly fall out of the top 6, before a brief resurgence in their final three games saw them qualify for the playoffs on the final day of the season with a 6th-placed finish and 75 points. The play-off campaign ended in defeat, Derby losing 2–1 on aggregate to Fulham, despite winning the first leg. Soon after the end of the season, Rowett requested permission to talk to Stoke City about their vacant managerial position.

Stoke City
Rowett was appointed Stoke City manager on 22 May 2018, signing a three-year contract, with Stoke paying Derby around £2m in compensation. Stoke, having been relegated from the Premier League the previous season gave Rowett a large transfer budget. The players he brought in were goalkeeper Adam Federici, experienced centre back Ashley Williams, full-back Cuco Martina, midfielders Sam Clucas, Peter Etebo and Ryan Woods, wingers Tom Ince and James McClean and forward Benik Afobe. The team made a poor start to the campaign winning only two of their opening ten matches. Stoke won back-to-back games at the beginning of October against Bolton Wanderers and Norwich City before losing to Rowett's old club Birmingham. City then went ten games unbeaten through November and December but made little progress up the table as Stoke drew six of them, conceding late equalisers on three occasions. Stoke's run was ended by another defeat to Birmingham on Boxing Day. After poor results against Bolton Wanderers and Bristol City supporters began to call for Rowett's departure. Rowett's contract with Stoke was terminated by the club on 8 January 2019.

Millwall
On 21 October 2019, Rowett was appointed as the new Millwall manager, succeeding Neil Harris, who left after more than four years in the post. On his debut five days later, the team won 2–0 at home to his previous club Stoke. After finishing 8th, 11th and 9th in his first three seasons, he signed a new contract of undisclosed length in July 2022.

Media career
Rowett reviewed Birmingham City matches with Tom Ross on radio station BRMB, and for the 2008–09 season, summarised matches involving Derby County for BBC Radio Derby.

Career statistics

As a player
Source:

As a manager

Honours

Player
Individual
PFA Team of the Year: 1998–99 First Division, 1999–2000 Second Division

Manager
Individual
League Two Manager of the Month: December 2012, February 2013

References

External links

1974 births
Living people
Sportspeople from Bromsgrove
English footballers
Association football defenders
Cambridge United F.C. players
Everton F.C. players
Blackpool F.C. players
Derby County F.C. players
Birmingham City F.C. players
Leicester City F.C. players
Charlton Athletic F.C. players
Burton Albion F.C. players
English Football League players
Premier League players
National League (English football) players
English football managers
Burton Albion F.C. managers
Birmingham City F.C. managers
English Football League managers
Derby County F.C. managers
Stoke City F.C. managers
Millwall F.C. managers